The Roman Catholic Diocese of Merlo-Moreno (erected 13 May 1997) is in Argentina and is a suffragan of the Archdiocese of Mercedes-Luján, having had change of metropolitan from Buenos Aires in 2019.

The patroness is the Blessed Virgin Mary of Guadalupe.

The partidos (departments) that fall into the diocese are Merlo and Moreno.

Bishops

Ordinaries
  (1997–2012); he resigned and Bishop Emeritus  of San Isidro was named Apostolic Administrator  by Pope Benedict XVI on Tuesday, 26 June 2012
 Fernando Carlos Maletti (2013–2022)
 , C.M.F. (2022– )

Auxiliary bishop
  (2016– )

Other priests of this diocese who became bishops
 , appointed Bishop of Gregorio de Laferrere in 2013
 Fernando Miguel Gil Eisner, appointed Bishop of Salto, Uruguay in 2018

External links and references
 Cathedral Parish of Our Lady of the Rosary – Cathedral of Merlo-Moreno 
 

Roman Catholic dioceses in Argentina
Roman Catholic Ecclesiastical Province of Mercedes-Luján
Christian organizations established in 1997
Merlo Partido
Moreno Partido
Roman Catholic dioceses and prelatures established in the 20th century